Millas is a commune in the Pyrénées-Orientales department in southern France.

Geography

Localization 
Millas is located in the canton of La Vallée de la Têt and in the arrondissement of Perpignan.

Hydrography 
The river Têt runs through Millas. Floods often occur, as in 1892 when the level of the Têt in Millas rose up to 4,20 meters.

Demography

Notable residents
Marine Le Pen and Louis Aliot, both politicians, live in Millas.

Notable event
In December 2017, a school bus transporting children was split in two by a regional train running at 80 km/h as it passed over a level crossing in the village.

See also
Communes of the Pyrénées-Orientales department

References

Communes of Pyrénées-Orientales